Scarlet Harlots are a five-piece band from Birmingham, England. They shot to fame in 2008 when becoming finalists of the Channel 4 show Orange unsignedAct. The group have been together as this line-up for two years and have supported Jamie T, Young Knives, Howling Bells, The Twang, Reverend and the Makers and many other successful bands.

Orange Unsigned Act
In January 2009 the band reached the final of TV talent show Orange unsignedAct. They came in third place.  Three months on they are releasing their first EP :- "Word is Bone, Back is Strong" on 13 April 2009 consisting of four tracks:- "Benefits" "Porcelain" "A Secret" and "Backlash" on the independent records label Cut And Come Again.

After Orange Unsigned Act

After the recent exposure, the Scarlet Harlots were able to support Calvin Harris in Coventry on 1 May 2009. The Scarlet Harlots have released 'A Secret' remix EP on 19 October 2009.

References

External links

Scarlet Harlots Myspace

British indie rock groups